Krasnoyaruzhsky District is an administrative district (raion), one of the twenty-one in Belgorod Oblast, Russia. Municipally, it is incorporated as Krasnoyaruzhsky Municipal District. It is located in the west of the oblast. Its administrative center is the urban locality (a settlement) of Krasnaya Yaruga. Population:   15,128 (2002 Census). The population of Krasnaya Yaruga accounts for 56.2% of the district's total population.

Geography
Krasnoyaruzhsky District sits at the western edge of Belgorod Oblast, on the border with Ukraine. It is bordered on the south by Grayvoronsky District, on the west by Sumy Oblast in Ukraine, on the north by Belovsky District, Kursk Oblast, and on the east by Rakityansky District. The administrative center of the district is the town of Krasnaya Yaruga.
  

References

Notes

Sources

External links
 Krasnoyaruzhsky District on Google Maps
 Krasnoyaruzhsky District on OpenStreetMap

Districts of Belgorod Oblast